Villarrubia may refer to:

José Villarrubia (born 1961), Spanish artist
Villarrubia CF, Spanish football club
Villarrubia de Santiago, municipality in Castile-La Mancha, Spain
Villarrubia de los Ojos, municipality in Castile-La Mancha, Spain